Macna is a genus of snout moths. It was described by Francis Walker in 1859.

Species
 Macna atrirufalis Hampson, 1897
 Macna camiguina Semper, 1899
 Macna coelocrossa
 Macna darabitalis (Snellen, 1895)
 Macna hampsonii Nicéville, 1896
 Macna ignebasalis Hampson, 1897
 Macna leitimorensis Pagenstecher, 1884
 Macna metaxanthalis Hampson, 1916
 Macna minanga Semper, 1899
 Macna oppositalis (Walker, 1866)
 Macna platychloralis Walker, [1866]
 Macna pomalis Walker, [1859]
 Macna rubra Bethune-Baker, 1908
 Macna rufus Bethune-Baker, 1908

References

Pyralini
Pyralidae genera